Shchuchye (Shortandy) is a lake in Burabay District, Akmola Region, Kazakhstan.

The name of the lake means "pike" in Russian, and it was thus named because of the abundance of this fish in its waters. The lake is part of the Burabay National Park, a protected area.

Geography
Shchuchye lies in the eastern sector of the Kokshetau Lakes, SSE of lake Kishi Shabakty and SSW of Lake Burabay. It is the deepest lake of the whole group. There are three small rocky islets by the southwestern shore and one in the northwest. The bottom of the lake is mostly muddy, with a sandy zone in the southwestern part.

Shchuchinsk city lies to the southwest by the lake and was named after it in the 19th century. Burabay spa town  to the NNE.

Flora and fauna
There are forests close to the lakeshore in most stretches. The native fish species living in the lake are pike, crucian carp, roach, tench and perch. European cisco and peled have been introduced. There may be a population of ninespine stickleback and carp as well.

See also
List of lakes of Kazakhstan

References

External links
Burabay National Park (in Russian)

Lakes of Kazakhstan
North Kazakhstan Region
Kazakh Uplands

ru:Щучье (озеро, Акмолинская область)